The 2011–12 Football League Championship was Millwall's 127th season in existence, 86th season in the Football League and 37th in the second tier of English football. It is Millwall's second continuous season in the Championship, after promotion from League One in 2010. This season marks manager Kenny Jackett's fourth full season in charge of the club.

Season review

Results summary

Result round by round

Matches

Pre-season

The Championship

League Cup

FA Cup

Championship

Standings

Squad statistics

Appearances and goals

|-
|colspan="14"|Players featured for club who have left:

|}

Top scorers

Disciplinary record

Squad

Detailed overview

Contracts

Transfers

Summer

In

Out

External links
Official Website

2011–12
2011–12 Football League Championship by team
Millwall F.C. Season, 2011–12
Millwall F.C. Season, 2011–12